"Leash Called Love" is a song written and recorded by the Icelandic band the Sugarcubes for their 1992 album Stick Around for Joy, and their follow up to their number one Billboard Modern Rock Tracks single "Hit". The track dealt with the subject of a woman's vow to break free from the emotional and physical abuse from her lover, hence the song's title. The song would also be the group's final single release before their break up in 1993.
 
While the single did not chart the Billboard Modern Rock or Hot 100 charts, it would eventually find better success on the magazine's Dance Club Songs chart, where it was restructured into a house music setting by Tony Humphries for the compilation It's-It, eventually becoming the act's first and only number one single on that chart, and cemented lead singer Björk's new found success in the dance and electronic music community.

Track listing
12" (US)
A1. Leash Called Love (12" Mix) (6:25)
A2. Leash Called Love (Mo Nu Dub) (6:18)
B1. Leash Called Love (Mo No Ride) (6:24)

See also 
 List of number-one dance singles of 1992 (U.S.)

References

External links 
Release Information from Discogs
live version from YouTube
Tony Humphries Remix from YouTube

1992 singles
Songs written by Björk
Songs about domestic violence
Songs with feminist themes